{{DISPLAYTITLE:C21H23NO3}}
The molecular formula C21H23NO3 may refer to:

 N-(p-Amylcinnamoyl)anthranilic acid
 Olopatadine
 3-Quinuclidinyl benzilate

Molecular formulas